Peter von Kant is a 2022 French comedy drama film written and directed by François Ozon. It is a loose adaptation of Rainer Werner Fassbinder's play The Bitter Tears of Petra von Kant, which he adapted into a film in 1972, but here with the protagonist's gender changed. It is Ozon's second cinematic outing of a Fassbinder play after Water Drops on Burning Rocks (2000).

The film premiered in competition at the Berlin International Film Festival as its opening film on 10 February 2022.

Plot 
In the 1970s in Cologne, Peter von Kant is a filmmaker in his forties who is experiencing growing success. Having gone through a difficult love affair, he now lives with his assistant Karl, who is totally devoted to him despite being mistreated.

Through Sidonie, a famous actress whose career he had once launched, he meets the young and handsome North African actor Amir. Quickly falling in love with him, Peter takes him under his wing and fast-tracks their relationship, quickly casting him in his new film's lead role. Amir drives Peter wild with jealousy, leading to a series of shouting matches and cruel power plays. Ultimately, the couple hits their breaking point, as Amir leaves Peter to go back to his wife, resulting in a dramatic and emotional finale.

Cast 
 Denis Ménochet as Peter von Kant
 Isabelle Adjani as Sidonie
 Khalil Gharbia as Amir
 Hanna Schygulla as Rosemarie
 Stéfan Crépon as Karl
 Aminthe Audiard as Gabrielle

Production
Filming began in March 2021.

Release
In March 2022, Strand Releasing acquired the US rights to the film.

Reception
On review aggregator website Rotten Tomatoes, the film holds an approval rating of 78%, based on 40 reviews, and an average rating of 7/10. On Metacritic, the film has a weighted average score of 62 out of 100, based on 15 critics, indicating "generally favorable reviews".

References

External links
 

2022 films
2022 drama films
2022 LGBT-related films
French drama films
French LGBT-related films
2020s French-language films
2020s German-language films
BDSM in films
French films based on plays
Remakes of German films
Films directed by François Ozon
LGBT-related drama films
2020s French films
Films based on works by Rainer Werner Fassbinder